Bejak (also known as Shahrak-e Emām) is a village in Tashan-e Sharqi Rural District, Tashan District, Behbahan County, Khuzestan Province, Iran. At the 2006 census, its population was 452, in 90 families.

References 

Populated places in Behbahan County